Calen Carr (born October 4, 1982) is an American former professional soccer player. He played in Major League Soccer for the Chicago Fire and Houston Dynamo as a forward and winger. He currently works for MLS as a match analyst for MLS Season Pass broadcasts on Apple TV and a host on the league's website.

Career

High School and College
Born in Oakland, California, Carr attended The Branson School in Ross, California until 2001, where he was the team Offensive Player of the Year three times. During this time, Carr trained at the Zico Academy in Brazil.

Carr played college soccer at the University of California, Berkeley, where he finished with 22 goals and 15 assists in 75 matches. He was redshirted in 2003 due to injury.  While with the Golden Bears, Carr was named All-Pac-10 First Team three times, as well as being an All-American and the Pac-10 Player of the Year in 2005.   In 2019, Carr was inducted into the Cal Athletics Hall of Fame.

He also played with Orange County Blue Star in the USL Premier Development League for two seasons, and in the summer of 2005, trained with Arsenal in England.

Professional

Chicago Fire 
Carr was drafted in the first round, 10th overall, by the Chicago Fire in the 2006 MLS SuperDraft. He made his Fire debut in the opening match of April 1, 2006, coming on as substitute in a 3–2 loss to FC Dallas.  Carr scored his first professional goal on June 11 in the stoppage time against the New England Revolution, however the Revs would score twice soon after, with the game ending 3–3.  On June 25, he recorded the first assist of his career in a 2–0 win over the New York Red Bulls.  The next match saw him Carr get his first career start, as he helped the Fire to a 2–1 win over Real Salt Lake.  He ended the regular season with 1 goal and 1 assist from 22 appearances, however just 3 of them were starts.  He appeared off the bench in both legs of Chicago's playoff matchup with New England, with the Revolution advancing on penalties.  In the 2006 U.S. Open Cup, Carr scored three goals and one assists as he helped the Fire win the Open Cup.

On may 17, 2007, Carr scored his first goal of the season in a 2–1 loss to FC Dallas.  On July 29, he had a goal and an assist in a 3–0 win over Toronto FC.  On October 21, he had an assist in the 93rd minute to give Chicago a 1–- 0win over the Los Angeles Galaxy.  Carr finished the regular season with 27 appearances, 10 of them starts, 3 goals and 2 assists, helping the Fire qualify for the playoffs.  After a 1–0 win for the Fire in the first leg of the Conference Semifinals, Carr had 2 assists to give the Fire a 2–2 draw in leg 2, advancing past D.C. United.  He came off the bench in the Conference Final as Chicago lost 1–0 to New England.

Carr scored his first goal of the 2008 season on May 17 in a 2–1 loss to the Houston Dynamo.  On July 1, Carr scored once in a 4–1 win over the Cleveland City Stars in the U.S. Open Cup.  He found the back of the net in Chicago's next match to help the Fire to a 2–2 draw with the Columbus Crew.  On July 8, Carr tore his right ACL during a 2–1 loss to D.C. United in the Open Cup quarterfinals.  He missed the rest of the season due to the injury, having made just 9 appearances up to that point in the regular season.

Carr returned to the field on July 4, 2009, coming on as a late substitute in a 2–1 win over the Colorado Rapids.  He would make 10 appearances in 2009, all of them off the bench.  He didn't play in any of the three playoff games for Chicago.

On February 8, 2010, Carr signed a new contract with Chicago.  He missed the first 4 months of the season due to a quadriceps injury suffered during preseason.  On August 18, Carr made his first appearance of the season, coming on as a substitute and scoring the winning goal in a 2–1 win over the New England Revolution.  In Chicago's next match, Carr scored as a sub again, however this time the Fire lost 4–3 to Houston.  Carr ended the season with 3 goals from 14 appearances, 4 of them being starts.

While playing for the Chicago Fire, Carr participated in an off-season friendly playing for Chivas USA against their sister club, C.D. Guadalajara.  Carr drew a penalty as the two sides drew 1-1.

During the 2011 preseason Carr suffered a serious concussion.

Houston Dynamo 
On March 23, 2011, Carr was traded to the Houston Dynamo in exchange for Dominic Oduro.  He made his Dynamo debut on August 17, 2011, coming on as a substitute in a 1–1 draw with the New England Revolution.  During the game, Carr wore a protective helmet for the first time, something he would do throughout the rest of his career.  On September 14, he came off the bench and scored in the 86th minute to give Houston a 2–2 draw with the Columbus Crew.  He ended the regular season with 1 goal from 9 appearances, 4 of them being starts.  In Houston's opening game of the playoffs, Carr scored to help the Dynamo to a 2–1 win over the Philadelphia Union.  Carr would start the second leg of the Conference Semifinals as Houston beat the Union 1–0 to advance.  He got the start in the Conference Finals as well, helping the Dynamo beat Sporting Kansas City 2–0 to advance to MLS Cup 2011, where Carr and the Dynamo would lose to the Los Angeles Galaxy 1–0.

Carr underwent surgery on his left knee ahead of the 2012 season.  Houston opened the 2012 season on March 11 with a 1–0 win over Chivas USA, with Carr coming off the bench in the game.  On June 16, he suffered a left hamstring strain during a 2–1 win over FC Dallas, forcing him to miss 5 games.  He returned from the injury on July 15, making a substitute appearance in a 4–0 win over D.C. United.  In Houston's next match, Carr scored twice to give the Dynamo a 2–1 win over Sporting Kansas City,  On July 21, he picked up his first assist of the season in a 3–0 win over the Montreal Impact.  On July 28, he scored in a 2–0 win against Toronto FC.  Carr found the back of the net again in Houston's next game, a 2–0 win over the New York Red Bulls.  On September 20, Carr played in his first career CONCACAF Champions League match, scoring once in a 4–0 win against C.D. FAS.  He ended the regular season with 4 goals and 2 assists from 27 appearances.  In the first match of the playoffs, Carr had an assist to help the Dynamo defeat the Chicago Fire 2–1.  In leg 1 of the Conference Semifinals, he had an assist to help Houston to a 2–0 win over Sporting Kansas City.  In the second leg, Carr went down with a left hamstring strain, but the Dynamo would still advance.  He would miss both legs of the Conference Finals, but the Dynamo would advance past D.C. United 4–2 on aggregate.  He returned from his hamstring injury to start MLS Cup 2012.  In the 44th minute Carr scored to put Houston up 1–0 over the Los Angeles Galaxy through one half. However, he would leave the game less than 10 minutes into the second half due to a torn left ACL. Los Angeles would go onto win 3–1.

Carr did not make any first team appearances in 2013 as a result of the injury, but he did make an appearance with the Dynamo reserves, scoring in the game.  He retired after the 2013 season.

Personal life 
Carr was born in Oakland, California and raised in nearby Berkeley, but spent significant time traveling around the world with mother, Claudia Carr, who was a professor at University of California, Berkeley.  His mom is white from Indianapolis, Indiana while his dad is Aboriginal Australian from Alice Springs, Northern Territory.  He founded a clothing company called Future Collective with two friends.

Post-playing career 
Since 2016, Carr has worked as a host for various shows on MLS's website and YouTube channel, including "The Movement" documentary series and the "Extratime" podcast.

Career statistics

Club 

Source:

Honors

Club 
Chicago Fire

 U.S. Open Cup: 2006

Houston Dynamo

 MLS Eastern Conference: 2011, 2012

Individual 

 Pac-10 Conference Men's Soccer Player of the Year: 2005

References

External links
 

1982 births
Living people
African-American soccer players
American soccer players
Association football forwards
California Golden Bears men's soccer players
Chicago Fire FC draft picks
Chicago Fire FC players
Houston Dynamo FC players
Major League Soccer players
Orange County Blue Star players
Soccer players from Berkeley, California
USL League Two players
21st-century African-American sportspeople
20th-century African-American people
American podcasters